King of the Dead may refer to:

 King of the Dead (album), the second album by the American heavy metal band Cirith Ungol
 King of the Dead (novel), a novel set in the Ravenloft campaign setting for Dungeons & Dragons
 King of the Dead, a character in the film The Lord of the Rings: The Return of the King
King of the Dead,  a song by XXXTENTACION